Don't You Worry 'bout a Thing  is a soul-jazz album by saxophonist Hank Crawford, released in 1975 on Kudu Records.

Track listing 

 "Don't You Worry 'bout a Thing" (S. Wonder) – 8:48
 "Jana" (Crawford) – 5:06
 "All in Love Is Fair" (S. Wonder) – 4:45
 "Sho Is Funky" (B. James, H. Crawford) – 12:45
 "Groove Junction" – 3:33

Personnel 

 Hank Crawford – alto sax
 Jerry Dodgion – flute, tenor sax
 Joe Farrell – flute, tenor sax
 Pepper Adams – baritone sax
 Romeo Penque – baritone sax
 Jon Faddis – trumpet, flugelhorn
 Randy Brecker – trumpet, flugelhorn
 Alan Rubin – trumpet, flugelhorn
 Hugh McCracken – guitar
 Richard Tee – keyboards
 Bob James – keyboards, arranger, conductor
 Ron Carter – bass 
 Gary King – bass
 Bernard Purdie – drums
 Idris Muhammad – drums
 Ralph MacDonald – percussion

References 

1975 albums
Hank Crawford albums
Albums produced by Creed Taylor
Albums recorded at Van Gelder Studio